Riosucio may refer to:

Riosucio, Caldas, a town and municipality in Caldas Department, Colombia
Riosucio, Chocó, a town and municipality in Chocó Department, Colombia